Lamet may refer to:
 Lamet language
 Lamet people
 Dinelson Lamet